The Henry Hurst Invitational was a golf tournament played at the Torresdale-Frankford Country Club in Philadelphia, Pennsylvania in September 1941. The event was won by Sam Snead who took the first prize of $1,500. An event was planned for 1942 but was canceled.

The event was played from September 19 to 21. Sam Snead led after the first round with a 64. After a second round 74 he had rounds of 69 and 65 on the final day to win by 8 strokes from Dick Metz.

Winners

References

Former PGA Tour events
Golf in Pennsylvania